Karanveer Khullar is an Indian actor who mainly work in Hindi and Punjabi film industry. He is best known for his movies like Nirmal Anand ki Puppy, Rocky Mental and Tigers.

Early life 
Khullar was born and brought in Chandigarh. He completed his MBA in HR. after his graduation, he joined Alankar Theatre Group. He was the finalist in a national-level manhunt contest (2009).

Career 
In 2017, Khullar made his debut in Punjabi film industry as negative lead in film Rocky Mental starring Parmish Verma, Tannu Kaur Gill.

He debuted in Hindi film industry with the film Tigers starring Emraan Hashmi.

In 2021, he played as lead in the film Nirmal Anand Ki Puppy. He also acted in the film Kala Shehar and Please Kill Me as a lead with Jagjeet Sandhu.

Filmography

References 

Indian male film actors
Male actors from Chandigarh
Living people
Year of birth missing (living people)